Richard Saccone (born February 14, 1958) is an American educator and politician who represented Pennsylvania's 39th district in the Pennsylvania House of Representatives from 2011 to 2019. A Republican, he was his party's nominee for the March 2018 special election to fill in the vacant U.S. House seat for the 18th congressional district. Saccone lost to Democratic candidate Conor Lamb by a margin of 0.3%.

He posted a video of himself on Facebook while standing in view of the 2021 storming of the United States Capitol. He posted on Facebook that, "We are storming the capitol. Our vanguard has broken thru the barricades. We will save this nation. Are you with me?"  He later added that he and the other rioters would "run out all the evil people in there, and all the RINOs that have betrayed our president." Following an investigation into Saccone's role in the attack on the Capitol, Saccone resigned his position as an adjunct professor at Saint Vincent College before he could be dismissed.

On August 31, 2021, Saccone declared his intention to run for Lieutenant Governor in the 2022 gubernatorial election. He finished second in the primary behind Carrie DelRosso.

Education and career
Saccone received a bachelor's degree in psychology/criminal justice from Weber State College in 1981, a master's degree in public administration from the University of Oklahoma in 1984, and a master's degree in national security affairs from the Naval Postgraduate School in 1987. Saccone received a Ph.D. in public and international affairs from the University of Pittsburgh in 2002.

He was later on the faculty of Saint Vincent College in Latrobe, Pennsylvania. He served as a United States Air Force officer, working in the Office of Special Investigation, counter intelligence. After resigning from the Air Force, Saccone was a civilian employee of the U.S. Army during the Iraq War, working in Iraq from 2004 to 2005. While in Iraq, Saccone worked as an interrogation consultant at Abu Ghraib prison.

According to his official and campaign biographies, Saccone worked as an anchor for an English-language television news station in South Korea, and worked for businesses in South Korea and Central America. He spent 12 years in South Korea, where he met his wife.

Saccone's official biography states that he worked in North Korea on "an agreement meant to prevent the development of nuclear weapons there." However, Saccone was not a diplomat, but rather was one of several U.S. representatives for the Korean Peninsula Energy Development Organization, working there from December 2000 to December 2001. The organization handled a construction project to generate civilian nuclear energy for North Korea while preventing the country from making nuclear weapons. Former U.S. and Southern Korean colleagues said that Saccone had embellished his role, and that he was present at negotiations with North Korea only as a low-level observer. Dr Saccone wrote two books about dealing with North Korea and his time spent there, Living with the Enemy: Inside North Korea, and Negotiating with North Korea.

Political career

Pennsylvania House of Representatives
In 2010, Saccone challenged incumbent Democratic Rep. David Levdansky for the 39th District seat in the Pennsylvania House of Representatives, and defeated Levdansky by 151 votes (50.3% to 49.7%). Levdansky challenged Saccone to a rematch in 2012; Saccone defeated him again by a margin of 50.2%-49.8%.

Saccone was re-elected with 60% of the vote in 2014 and 70% in 2016. The district includes part of Allegheny County and part of Washington County.

2018 U.S. Senate run

In February 2017, Saccone filed with the FEC to run for United States Senate in the 2018 election, seeking to challenge incumbent Bob Casey Jr., and officially declared his candidacy later that month.

Saccone is a supporter of Donald Trump and pledged to be a Trump ally if elected to the Senate. On October 8, 2017, he suspended his U.S. Senate campaign to announce that he would seek the Republican nomination for the 18th Congressional District special election.

2018 18th congressional district special election

On November 11, 2017, Saccone became the Republican nominee for the 18th congressional district special election held on March 13, 2018. The special election attracted national attention. Republicans spent more than $8 million on television advertising, twice as much as the Democrats, and Republican stars including Donald Trump (twice), Donald Trump Jr., Ivanka Trump, and Mike Pence came to the state to campaign for Saccone. As of March 14, Lamb led Saccone by 647 votes, mainly due to winning the Allegheny County portion of the district by 15,400 votes; Saccone won the rest of the district by 14,700 votes. The result of the election was considered too close to call by most news outlets, since the candidates were separated by only 0.2 percent, and a recount was expected. However, when it became apparent that Saccone would not be able to overcome Lamb's slim lead, he called Lamb to concede the race on March 21. In the final tally, Saccone lost by 0.3 percent.

Regular 14th congressional district election

After the Pennsylvania Supreme Court threw out the congressional map drawn by the state legislature and replaced it with a court-drawn map, most of the old 18th District was renumbered as the 14th district. On paper, the new 14th is even more Republican than its predecessor; Trump would have won it by 29 points had it existed in 2016. On March 15, Saccone announced that regardless of the final result in the special election for the 18th, he will run in the regular election for the new 14th. On May 15, Saccone lost the primary for the 14th district against Guy Reschenthaler (55%-45%).

Participation in the 2021 Capitol attack 

On January 6, 2021, Saccone took part in the pro-Trump riots outside the United States Capitol building. On his Facebook page, he posted a video, in which he said "They broke down the gates. They're macing them up there. We're trying to run out all the evil people in there and all the RINOs who have betrayed our president. We're going to run them out of their offices" and made a post captioned "We are storming the capitol... Are u [sic] with me?", during his participation. Saccone subsequently deleted the video. On January 7, Saccone resigned from his position of adjunct professor at St. Vincent College.

Political positions

Donald Trump
During his brief 2018 Senate run, Saccone pledged to be a Donald Trump ally if elected to the Senate. In January 2018, Saccone was endorsed by Trump after winning the Republican nomination for the 18th congressional district special election. Saccone closely identifies with Trump and in 2018 called himself "Trump before Trump was Trump."

Saccone's campaign in the 2018 special election attracted national attention, and was seen by many political analysts and commentators as a bellwether on the popularity of the Republican party, Trump's taxes on foreign-made steel and aluminum imports, and the 2018 House election.  Saccone has purposely stoked this portrayal, and called the special election a referendum on the Presidency of Donald Trump.

Abortion
Saccone introduced bills to limit abortion rights. He supported legislation that would effectively ban abortions after 20 weeks of gestation.

Church and state
Saccone's beliefs are strongly influenced by Christian reconstructionist and author David Barton, who also introduced at a rally during Saccone's 2018 special election run.

In 2013, Saccone attracted attention for introducing the National Motto Display Act, a bill to require public school districts in Pennsylvania to post "In God We Trust" (the national motto) in every school building.

The 2013 legislation failed, but in 2016, Saccone co-sponsored similar legislation (which would encourage but not mandate the posting of the motto in schools). The bill passed on a 179–20 vote in May 2016. The legislation was criticized by secular advocacy groups, such as the Freedom from Religion Foundation. Also in 2013, Saccone sponsored a "day of prayer" resolution, seeking to designate April 30 as a National Fast Day.

In January 2012, Saccone introduced to the state House a nonbinding resolution (Resolution No. 535) to declare 2012 as the "Year of the Bible" in Pennsylvania. The resolution passed unanimously, but was criticized by Americans United for Separation of Church and State. The resolution drew considerable political controversy in Pennsylvania, as well as national attention.

The Freedom from Religion Foundation filed a federal lawsuit over the resolution, Freedom From Religion Foundation v. Saccone, alleging a violation of the Establishment Clause. U.S. District Judge Christopher C. Conner dismissed the suit on the grounds of legislative immunity, but criticized the legislature for using state resources to "provide a re-election sound bite for use by members of the General Assembly."

In an interview in 2017 with the Pastors Network of America, Saccone stated that God wants those who have the "fear of God in them" to "rule over us".

Budget, taxation, and fiscal policy
Saccone supported the federal Republican tax legislation enacted in 2017, saying "I'm sorry I wasn’t there to vote for it." Over the course of the campaign for the 2018 special election seat, Saccone distanced himself from ads which touted his support for the tax cuts and the ads, which while prominent at the start of the campaign, were cycled out.

In 2017, Saccone was part of a faction of Republican state lawmakers who sought to close a $2.3 billion deficit in the state budget through spending cuts alone; Saccone said that he preferred to close the budget gap by redirecting non-General Fund funds in "nonperforming" (unused) special funds but that he was open to across-the-board spending cuts.

Education
While in office Saccone has consistently called for spending cuts, including to funding for early childhood and K-12 education, public libraries, and child welfare.

Guns
Saccone is known for his strong advocacy of gun rights. In 2017, he sponsored at least four bills seeking to expand the rights of gun owners; one such bill would amend state law to prohibit discrimination against gun carriers; a co-sponsorship memorandum for the bill criticized Chuck E. Cheese's for its "policy barring customers from carrying firearms inside" the venue.

Organized labor
Saccone favors right-to-work legislation, which makes it illegal for workers in unionized workplaces to be compelled into joining unions. According to NBC News, "Saccone’s conservative record has united organized labor against him." Saccone disputes the characterization, saying "the union members have always voted for me. Their leadership has never represented their members, and they know that."

In 2017, Saccone sought to limit the practice of allowing some teachers to work full-time for teachers' unions under the classification "teachers on special assignment" (with those teachers' wages reimbursed by the union to the school district). In 2017, three teachers with the Pittsburgh Federation of Teachers worked full-time in that role. Saccone described the employees as "ghost teachers" and sponsored legislation that would limit teachers to no more than 15 days of union activity annually.

Lobbying
Saccone introduced legislation that would prohibit public officials from accepting "transportation, lodging or hospitality or anything of economic value as a gift" from lobbyists. Saccone said, "I have at least 20 lobbyist groups that have never taken me out for anything. They come to my office, they make their pitch and they go away. And that is how it should be." However, it was later reported that Saccone did routinely get meals paid by lobbyists; Saccone justified getting gifted meals by lobbyists, saying that he had to have the meals with the lobbyists because other lawmakers did and he did not want to isolate himself from other lawmakers.

Torture
Saccone advocated for waterboarding, sleep deprivation, and other forms of torture in articles and his book.

Roy Moore special election

In 2017, during a special election campaign for a U.S. Senate seat in Alabama, Saccone defended Republican nominee Roy Moore, who had been accused of sexual misconduct involving teenage girls; after a reporter asked a different Republican state representative (Kathy Rapp), whether she found it "compassionate that your party may soon elect an accused child molester to the United States Senate," Saccone remarked, "Do you believe in the presumption of innocence?"

Use of legislative expense account
According to The Intercept, records from the Pennsylvania General Assembly showed that Saccone used his legislative expense account, which is funded by taxpayers, "for meals, per diem payments, and other items at a rate higher than most lawmakers". The investigation showed that Saccone purchased 36 line items for various flag and flag accessory purchases totaling $4,436.30. Saccone also spent $117,400 to lease an office from Dowling Properties, a real estate company founded by Celine Dowling, one of his campaign donors.

Personal life
Saccone is a Baptist. He is married to Yong Saccone whom he met in South Korea. The couple have two sons, Nick and Matthew.

Electoral history

References

External links
Official legislative website
Official campaign website

1958 births
Living people
Protesters in or near the January 6 United States Capitol attack
21st-century American politicians
Republican Party members of the Pennsylvania House of Representatives
Naval Postgraduate School alumni
People from Allegheny County, Pennsylvania
United States Air Force officers
University of Oklahoma alumni
University of Pittsburgh alumni
Weber State University alumni
Baptists from Pennsylvania
Place of birth missing (living people)
Candidates in the 2018 United States Senate elections